Archey's frog (Leiopelma archeyi) is an archaic species of frog endemic to the North Island of New Zealand. It is one of only three extant species belonging to the taxonomic family Leiopelmatidae. It is named after Sir Gilbert Archey, the former director of the Auckland Institute. The holotype is held at the Auckland War Memorial Museum. It is found only in the Coromandel Peninsula and near Te Kuiti in the North Island of New Zealand. This species, along with others in the family, have changed little over the past 200 million years, thus they represent "living fossils".

Ecology

The species is fully terrestrial, living and reproducing under damp vegetation in native forests. Currently, its distribution is confined to higher elevations at just two localities, although just 25 years ago, the species was abundant in a much wider range, down to sea level. Little is known about the natural history of this species. Although the species is sexually monomorphic, males are believed to be the primary care providers, and may prepare "nests" they guard for the eggs, secreting antimicrobial peptides onto them, to ensure successful embryonic development. Clutch sizes vary between four and 15 eggs. Reproduction is fully terrestrial; tadpoles develop within gelatinous egg capsules, and upon hatching, tailed froglets crawl onto the male's back and are carried around for several weeks where they complete metamorphosis. Adult frogs do not give advertisement vocalisations, but may communicate by chemical signalling. However, frogs sometimes give startle calls when threatened by a predator.

Conservation

An intensively monitored population in one Cormandel site declined by 88% from 1996 to 2001, but in many areas where frogs previously were common, none remain. Because populations are rapidly declining, and reproduction is infrequent, the species is at significant risk of imminent extinction. In 2006 70 Archey's frogs were translocated to Pureora Forest however despite breeding being observed only low numbers of frogs have been counted.

As first shown by Bruce Waldman, the species appears to have an intrinsically low level of susceptibility to chytridiomycosis. However, frogs in the field show clinical signs, including blisters, that may be associated with other diseases. Nonetheless, despite field observations suggesting that frogs were dying from other causes, New Zealand researchers continued to argue that the species was most at risk from chytridiomycosis and planned their management strategies primarily to mitigate threats from this disease. After his research permits were withdrawn by the Department of Conservation, Waldman subsequently left New Zealand. 

A captive-breeding programme was established at the University of Canterbury in 2002 to safeguard the species from disease, and frogs successfully bred. The programme was transferred to Auckland Zoo in 2005, where over half of the frogs, including juveniles bred at the Canterbury facility, died. Some of the remaining frogs produced offspring in December 2012, of which seven still survived as of February, 2013. After 8 years of failed attempts to get the frogs to breed at Auckland Zoo, zookeepers claimed "a massive and internationally important victory". Based on an Auckland Zoo press release that promoted their new public display of adult Archey's frogs, the Auckland Zoo breeding was widely but inaccurately reported as representing the first time the frogs had successfully reproduced in captivity. Auckland Zoo, Otago University, and James Cook University researchers attribute the mortality and reproductive failures at Auckland Zoo in part to metabolic bone disease, which they determined had not been a problem in the Canterbury facility.

The species is categorised as Nationally Vulnerable under the New Zealand Threat Classification System and as Critically Endangered on the IUCN Red List. Rats and the introduced green and golden bell frog are known to kill Archey's frogs. Introduced predators known to predate other frog species in New Zealand, such as pigs, cats, hedgehogs and ferrets, are also likely to have an impact.

See also
Frogs of New Zealand

References

External links 
 Archey's frog featured on RNZ Our Changing World, 28 April 2016
 Archey's frog discussed on RNZ's Critter of the Week, 30 October 2015

Leiopelmatidae
Amphibians of New Zealand
Endemic fauna of New Zealand
Endangered biota of New Zealand
Amphibians described in 1942
Endemic amphibians of New Zealand